The Jammu and Kashmir People's Conference is a political party in Jammu and Kashmir, India, founded by Abdul Ghani Lone and Molvi Iftikhar Hussain Ansari in 1978. It is currently led by Sajjad Lone. It won two seats in the Jammu and Kashmir Legislative Assembly in the 2014 elections.

History

Abdul Ghani Lone founded the People's Conference in 1977 and it was the only separatist organization registered with the Election Commission of India till 1996. 

In 1993, Lone joined the secessionist Hurriyat Conference. His ideology about Kashmir was to make it an 'Independent Kashmir' after being anti-India as well as anti-Pakistan.

See also 
 Politics of Jammu and Kashmir 
 Jammu & Kashmir National Conference
 Jammu and Kashmir Peoples Democratic Party
 Jammu and Kashmir Apni Party
 Jammu and Kashmir Workers Party
 Ikkjutt Jammu 
 Bharatiya Janata Party
 Indian National Congress

References

Political parties in India
Political parties with year of establishment missing
State political parties in Jammu and Kashmir
Political parties established in 1978
1978 establishments in Jammu and Kashmir
Jammu and Kashmir People's Conference